Berting Labra (born Roberto S. Labra; April 17, 1933 – February 10, 2009) was a Filipino child star and veteran actor equally adept in comedy and drama, in action flicks and musicals.

Personal life and career
Labra starred in Apat na Taga in 1953. He was a child star who shared screen with Fernando Poe Sr. in several films, including Palaboy ng Tadhana, Sagur, Kanto Boy, and Alimudin.

He was only six years old when he made his stage debut. He was discovered by Poe Sr. when he was looking for a child actor who could sing for the movie.

Labra also witnessed the murder of his father, Francisco Labra, former bantamweight and featherweight champion of the Orient, in the hands of Japanese soldiers. "He was tortured," Labra told the Philippine Daily Inquirer in a 2005 interview.

The elder Poe became the 10-year-old's foster father.

Five years after the elder Poe's death, Labra, then a teenage, teamed up with Fernando "Da King" Poe Jr. in the 1956 box-office hit Lo' Waist Gang, a film that spawned a string of other movies and a lifelong friendship with Da King.

In 1969, Labra and fellow action star Eddie Fernandez were jailed for murder. Labra spent 13 years in Muntinlupa, only to be exonerated by the Supreme Court.

On December 25, 1982, the film The Cute... The Sexy n' The Tiny premiered. Labra plays one the leads.

Labra appeared in the 1991 action film Manong Gang with actor Ramon "Bong" Revilla Jr. alongside Dina Bonevie, Paquito Diaz and Max Alvarado. Labra's last film, the 2007 comedy M.O.N.A.Y ni Mr. Shooli, co-starred actor Leo Martinez.

Death
Labra died on February 10, 2009, due to heart attack. He was 75 years old. Labra's remains were buried in the Garden of Memories in Pateros.

Filmography

Film

Television

Awards
1962 FAMAS BEST ACTOR - Ano Ba Choy?
1964 FAMAS SUPPORTING ACTOR - Lumuluhang Komiko

Trivia
Fernando Poe, Jr. once stated that "Berting was the greatest Filipino actor of all time."
He was named Mickey Rooney and Bobby Breen of the Philippines, the Filipino version of Hollywood Child Wonders in the 1940s.

Sources

1933 births
2009 deaths
20th-century comedians
Deaths from cancer in the Philippines
Deaths from emphysema
Filipino male child actors
Filipino male comedians
Filipino male film actors
Filipino male television actors
Male actors from Manila
People from Pateros